The 2010 All-Big 12 Conference football team consists of American football players chosen as All-Big 12 Conference players for the 2010 Big 12 Conference football season.  The conference recognizes two official All-Big 12 selectors: (1) the Big 12 conference coaches selected separate offensive and defensive units and named first- and second-team players (the "Coaches" team); and (2) a panel of sports writers and broadcasters covering the Big 12 also selected offensive and defensive units and named first- and second-team players (the "Media" team).

Offensive selections

Quarterbacks
 Brandon Weeden, Oklahoma State (Coaches-1; Media-1)
 Robert Griffin III, Baylor (Coaches-2)
 Landry Jones, Oklahoma (Media-2)

Running backs
 Kendall Hunter, Oklahoma State (Coaches-1; Media-1)
 Daniel Thomas, Kansas State (Coaches-2; Media-1)
 DeMarco Murray, Oklahoma (Coaches-1)
 Cyrus Gray, Texas A&M (Media-2)
 Rodney Stewart, Colorado (Media-2)
 Roy Helu Jr., Nebraska (Coaches-2)

Fullbacks
 Bryant Ward, Oklahoma State (Coaches-1)
 Trey Millard, Oklahoma (Coaches-2)

Centers
 Tim Barnes, Missouri (Coaches-1; Media-1)
 Wade Weibert, Kansas State (Media-1)
 Matt Allen, Texas A&M (Coaches-2)
 Ben Lamaak, Iowa State (Coaches-2)

Guards
 Ricky Henry, Nebraska (Coaches-1; Media-1)
 Danny Watkins, Baylor (Coaches-2; Media-1)
 Zach Kendall, Kansas State (Coaches-2; Media-2)

Tackles
 Levy Adcock, Oklahoma State (Coaches-1; Media-1)
 Nate Solder, Colorado (Coaches-1; Media-1)
 Eric Mensik, Oklahoma (Coaches-1; Media-2)
 Lonnie Edwards, Texas Tech (Coaches-2)
 Dan Hoch, Missouri (Media-2)
 Mickey Okafor, Texas Tech (Media-2)

Tight ends
 Michael Egnew, Missouri (Coaches-1; Media-1)
 Collin Franklin, Iowa State (Coaches-2; Media-2)

Receivers
 Justin Blackmon, Oklahoma State (Coaches-1; Media-1)

Defensive selections

Defensive linemen
 Sam Acho, Texas (Coaches-1; Media-1)
 Jeremy Beal, Oklahoma (Coaches-1; Media-1)
 Jared Crick, Nebraska (Coaches-1; Media-1)
 Colby Whitlock, Texas Tech (Coaches-2; Media-1)
 Pierre Allen, Nebraska (Coaches-1)
 Aldon Smith, Missouri (Coaches-1)
 Josh Hartigan, Colorado (Media-2)
 Brad Madison, Missouri (Media-2)
 Lucas Patterson, Texas A&M (Media-2)
 Phil Taylor, Baylor (Coaches-2; Media-2)
 Ugo Chinasa, Oklahoma State (Coaches-2)
 Jacquies Smith, Missouri (Coaches-2)
 Cameron Meredith, Nebraska (Coaches-2)

Linebackers
 Lavonte David, Nebraska (Coaches-1; Media-1)
 Orie Lemon, Oklahoma State (Coaches-1; Media-1)
 Von Miller, Texas A&M (Coaches-1; Media-1)
 Andrew Gachkar, Missouri (Media-1)
 Travis Lewis, Oklahoma (Coaches-2; Media-2)
 Jake Knott, Iowa State (Coaches-2; Media-2)
 Emmanuel Acho, Texas (Coaches-2)
 Michael Hodges, Texas A&M (Media-2)
 Keenan Robinson, Texas (Media-2)

Defensive backs
 Prince Amukamara, Nebraska (Coaches-1; Media-1)
 Jamell Fleming, Oklahoma (Media-1)
 Eric Hagg, Nebraska (Coaches-1; Media-1)
 Quinton Carter, Oklahoma (Coaches-1; Media-2)
 Andrew McGee, Oklahoma State (Coaches-1; Media-2)
 Byron Landor, Baylor (Media-1)
 Jimmy Smith, Colorado (Coaches-1)
 Alfonzo Dennard, Nebraska (Coaches-2; Media-2)
 Aaron Williams, Texas (Coaches-2; Media-2)
 Leonard Johnson, Iowa State (Coaches-2)
 Coryell Judie, Texas A&M (Coaches-2)
 Ty Zimmerman, Kansas State (Coaches-2)
 Curtis Brown, Texas (Coaches-2)

Special teams

Kickers
 Dan Bailey, Oklahoma State (Coaches-1; Media-2)
 Alex Henery, Nebraska (Coaches-2; Media-1)

Punters
 Quinn Sharp, Oklahoma State (Coaches-1; Media-1)
 Alex Henery, Nebraska (Coaches-2)
 Kirby Van Der Kamp, Iowa State (Media-2)

All-purpose / Return specialists
 DeMarco Murray, Oklahoma (Media-1)
 William Powell, Kansas State (Coaches-1)
 Niles Paul, Nebraska (Coaches-2)
 Eric Stephens, Texas Tech (Media-2)

Key
Bold = selected as a first-team player by both the coaches and media panel

Coaches = selected by Big 12 Conference coaches

Media = selected by a media panel

See also
2010 College Football All-America Team

References

All-Big 12 Conference
All-Big 12 Conference football teams